Concepto Radial is a Campus radio station at the Monterrey Institute of Technology and Higher Education, Mexico City. Founded in 1988, students use Concepto Radial to create radio shows featuring rock and alternative music. In addition, the station's programming covers technology, music, sports, news, entertainment, health prevention, and culture. Concepto Radial broadcasts 24 hours a day over the internet.

External links 
 Concepto Radial
 Concepto Radial at MySpace
 Concepto Radial at Twitter
 Concepto Radial at Facebook
 Concepto Radial Podcast 

Monterrey Institute of Technology and Higher Education
Radio stations in Mexico City